Nashville Christian School (or simply Nashville Christian) is a co-ed private Christian school for ages six weeks through 12th grade located in Bellevue, a neighborhood of Nashville, Tennessee. The school was founded in 1971 as white families sought to avoid having their children bussed across the city with black children during the court ordered desegregation of Nashville public schools.

History

Nashville Christian School opened on September 20, 1971 in the West Nashville Heights Church of Christ building. The school was founded as a segregation academy by white parents seeking to avoid sending their children to racially integrated public schools. In 1976, headmaster Daryl Demonbreun recalled that the school was not "only formed to avoid integration" but that "bussing was only the straw that broke the camel's back." In 1976 the school moved to a new location on Sawyer Brown Road in Bellevue. As of 1980, the school had no black students. In 1991 Buck Dozier, the president of the school, served as a member of a coalition to end court-ordered busing.

Academics

Nashville Christian serves as a college preparatory school to its high school students. The curriculum features twenty-seven college credits in English, math, history, and speech. Honors, dual enrollment, and Advanced Placement classes are also offered.

Extracurricular activities

Athletics

Nashville Christian's athletic teams, which were added within two years of its establishment, originally bore the nickname "Pioneers", until the student body voted to change the nickname to the "Eagles" in 1972. Today Nashville Christian fields athletic teams at both the middle school and high school levels. They include:

Varsity Baseball
Varsity Basketball
Varsity Football
Varsity Softball
Golf
Track
Wrestling
Cross Country
Soccer

References

External links

Christian schools in Tennessee
Schools in Nashville, Tennessee
Private K-12 schools in Tennessee
Educational institutions established in 1971
Segregation academies in Tennessee